Olari Elts (born April 27, 1971 in Tallinn) is an Estonian conductor. He was the principal conductor of the Latvian National Symphony Orchestra from 2001 to 2006. He is the founder and director of the contemporary music ensemble NYYD Ensemble.

In September 2006 he took up the newly created position of Artistic Advisor of the Orchestre National de Bretagne. He was appointed Principal Guest Conductor of the Scottish Chamber Orchestra from the beginning of the 2007–2008 season.  Also in 2007, he was appointed Principal Guest Conductor of the Estonian National Symphony Orchestra.

Elts has conducted Finnish Radio, Yomiuri Symphony Orchestra, Dresden Sinfoniker, Stuttgart Radio Symphony Orchestra, Lucerne Symphony, Orchestre National du Capitole de Touloluse, City of Birmingham Symphony, Ensemble Modern and the Cincinnati Symphony Orchestra, with whom he made his US debut.  He also visits Australia and New Zealand regularly, appearing with orchestras including Melbourne Symphony Orchestra, Adelaide Symphony Orchestra, Western Australian Symphony Orchestra and the New Zealand Symphony Orchestra.

Elts' opera work includes appearances with the Estonian National Opera, conducting Britten's Albert Herring and Puccini's Il Trittico, as well as Mozart's Don Giovanniand Idomeneo with the Estonian National Symphony Orchestra. In autumn 2008 he conducted performances of Marschner's Der Vampyr at the Rennes Opera House, and also in Hungary.

In 2001 Elts was awarded the IVth Class Order of the White Star by Estonia in recognition for his outstanding contribution to music.

Competitions 

Elts has won the following conductor's competitions:
 Second International Sibelius Conductors' Competition, 2000
 First Jorma Panula Conducting Competition, 1999

References

External links 

 Olari Elts juhatab Milwaukee sümfooniaorkestrit ERR April 5, 2009

Estonian conductors (music)
1971 births
Living people
Tallinn Music High School alumni
Estonian choral conductors
Estonian Academy of Music and Theatre alumni
University of Music and Performing Arts Vienna alumni
Musicians from Tallinn
21st-century conductors (music)
Recipients of the Order of the White Star, 4th Class